Pico do Papagaio is the highest mountain in the Brazilian state of Pernambuco, at .

References 

Mountains of Brazil
Highest points of Brazilian states
Landforms of Pernambuco